Marim ja... (trans. I Mind...) is the seventh studio album released by Serbian and former Yugoslav singer-songwriter Đorđe Balašević (credited simply as "Đole" on the album cover).

Track listing
All the songs were written by Đorđe Balašević.
"Čovek za koga se udala Buba Erdeljan" (The Man Buba Erdeljan Married) – 5:47
"Ringišpil" (Carousel) – 5:37
"Slabo divanim mađarski" (I Barely Speak Hungarian) – 3:21
"Marim ja..." (I Mind...) – 4:15
"Nevernik" (Infidel) – 3:41
"Divlji badem" (Wild Almond) – 3:56
"Citron pesma" (The Citrus Song) – 3:04
"Olelole" – 3:46
"Kako su zli dedaci razbucali proslavu godišnjice braka kod mog druga Jevrema" (How The Evil Old Men Ruined My Friend Jevrem's Wedding Anniversary Celebration) – 4:39

Personnel
Đorđe Balašević – vocals
Aleksandar Dujin – piano, keyboards, backing vocals
Aleksandar Kravić – bass guitar
Elvis Stanić – guitar, backing vocals
Tonči Grabušić – drums, backing vocals
Davor Rodik – pedal steel guitar
Nenad Jazunović – timpani
Josip "Kiki" Kovač – violin
Đorđe Petrović – producer
Jan Šaš – engineer
Siniša Horvat – engineer

References
 EX YU ROCK enciklopedija 1960–2006, Janjatović Petar;  

1991 albums
Đorđe Balašević albums